Steven Absher Hamilton (November 30, 1934 – December 2, 1997) was a Major League Baseball (MLB) and National Basketball Association (NBA) player.

Basketball career

College
Hamilton attended Morehead State University in Morehead, Kentucky, from 1954–1958, where he excelled in basketball.  He scored 1,829 points (4th all-time) and established five MSU rebounding records—single-season average (20.1), average career (16.4), single game (38), single season (543), and career (1,675). He was an All-American in 1957, and a two-time All-Ohio Valley Conference First-Team selection.

NBA
From 1958 to 1960 he was a power forward/center for the Minneapolis Lakers. He played for the 1958/59 team that lost to the Boston Celtics during the 1959 NBA Finals. Over 2 seasons he averaged 4.5 points per game, 3.4 rebounds per game, and 0.5 assists per game.

Baseball career

Minors
Hamilton began pitching full time in the American League Cleveland Indians farm system in 1958.  A starter, he pitched four full years in the minor leagues, posting records of 15-14, 14-10, 13-9, and 10-12, and throwing between 172 and 210 innings pitched each season.

Early in the 1961 season he pitched briefly for the major league Cleveland franchise, pitching 3 innings in 2 appearance for the Indians.  After which he pitched the balance of the season at the top level of the minors, AAA.

Major League
Hamilton broke into the Major Leagues as a 26 year-old rookie in 1961.  He was lanky 6' 6" lefty, who took advantage of his immense NBA-sized wingspan to throw sidearm, creating a particularly difficult angle for left-handed batters.  A very rare starter, he was mostly a middle relief pitcher during his 12 MLB seasons - though he had a stint as the New York Yankees closer during the 1968 season. His best record was 7-2 (.778% win percentage) with New York in 1964, followed by 8-3 (.727%) in 1966.  His lowest ERA was 1.39 in 1965, then 2.13 in 1968.  In 1963, his first season with the Yankees, he struck out over one batter per inning (63 in 62.1).

In 421 career games (17 starts, 10 in 1962 alone) from 1961 to 1972 he had a 40–31 record with 42 saves and a 3.05 earned run average. He pitched 1 inning during the Yankees 1963 World Series loss to the Los Angeles Dodgers and 2 innings during the Yankees 1964 World Series loss to the St. Louis Cardinals, including 1 save. He also pitched in the 1971 NLCS for the San Francisco Giants.

His one complete game shutout was on August 5, 1966, against the Cleveland Indians, while pitching for the New York Yankees. He gave up 5 hits, walked 1 and struck out 3. It was one of only 3 starts he had in the 1966 season. Late in his career Hamilton threw what famously became known as  "The Folly Floater", a high, slow eephus pitch. Other pitchers who have thrown a lob pitch include Rip Sewell and Dave LaRoche.

Playing both sports
Hamilton pitched a full season in the minors in 1958 before he began his NBA career.  In the late 1950s both the NBA and MLB seasons were much more compact, with shorter seasons (just 72 games in the NBA, and 154 in MLB), shorter preseasons, and shorter postseasons (much shorter in MLB's case, with only a single round 7-game championship series for each sport, compared to a best-of-3 followed by two rounds of best of 7 in the NBA).  

Hamilton pitched all of the 1958 baseball season for the B-level minor league franchise of the big league Cleveland Indians.  Its season ended in or before early September, well before the major league did (in order to allow top AAA-level minor league "call-ups" to be added to expanded big league rosters, that rose from 24 to 40 that month).  Hamilton was not one of them.

The 1958-59 NBA season began on October 17. The 1958 Minneapolis Lakers were swept in the Finals 0-4 by the Boston Celtics, with the last game of the series being played on April 8, 1959.

Hamilton played for the Single-A Cleveland minor league franchise in 1959, which also would have ended its season around or before September 1st.  The 1959 Minneapolis Lakers  made the playoffs, but fell in the division finals, with the last game being played on March 25, 1960.

Hamilton pitched for Cleveland's Double-A minor league franchise in 1960.  The 1960 Los Angeles Lakers fell 3-4 in the division finals, the last game of which was played on April 1, 1961.  Hamilton made his major league debut with the Indians on April 23, 1961, pitched in two games, then spent the balance of his season at the AAA level.  

By 1962 he was out of the NBA, and pitching regularly in the major leagues with the Washington Senators franchise.

Personal
After his major league career ended, he was a Detroit Tigers coach in 1975 and was the athletic director at his alma mater, Morehead State University. Tommy John, who met Hamilton while both were in the Indians organization, recalled that "he had two prominent physical characteristics, other than his height: a protruding Adam's apple that bobbed as he spoke, and a Nellie Fox-sized wad of chewing tobacco in his cheek."

Hamilton died of colon cancer at his home in Morehead, Kentucky, on December 2, 1997, and was buried in nearby Forest Lawn Garden of Memories.

Honors

Hamilton is one of only two people to have played in both a World Series and an NBA finals. (The other is Gene Conley, who won both a World Series (in 1957 with the Milwaukee Braves) and an NBA finals (from 1959 to 1961 with the Boston Celtics).)

Hamilton is one of 13 athletes to have played in both the National Basketball Association and Major League Baseball. The thirteen are: Danny Ainge,  Frank Baumholtz, Hank Biasatti, Gene Conley, Chuck Connors, Dave DeBusschere, Dick Groat, Hamilton, Mark Hendrickson, Cotton Nash, Ron Reed, Dick Ricketts and Howie Schultz.

See also
 List of NCAA Division I men's basketball players with 30 or more rebounds in a game
 List of NCAA Division I men's basketball career rebounding leaders

References

External links

Retrosheet

1934 births
1997 deaths
American men's basketball players
Baseball players from Kentucky
Basketball players from Kentucky
Burlington Indians players (1958–1964)
Deaths from cancer in Kentucky
Centers (basketball)
Chicago Cubs players
Chicago White Sox players
Cleveland Indians players
Deaths from colorectal cancer
Detroit Tigers coaches
Forwards (basketball)
Jacksonville Suns players
Major League Baseball pitchers
Major League Baseball pitching coaches
Minneapolis Lakers draft picks
Minneapolis Lakers players
Mobile Bears players
Morehead State Eagles athletic directors
Morehead State Eagles baseball coaches
Morehead State Eagles baseball players
Morehead State Eagles men's basketball players
New York Yankees players
People from Charlestown, Indiana
People from Columbia, Kentucky
Philadelphia Warriors draft picks
Reading Indians players
Salt Lake City Bees players
San Francisco Giants players
Washington Senators (1961–1971) players